Savage Island lies on the last free flowing stretch of the Columbia River known as the Hanford Reach in Washington, United States; other interesting geological features of the area include the White Bluffs, as well across the river the Hanford Dunes. The island is within the boundaries of the Wahluke Wildlife Unit, a natural preserve managed by the US Fish and Wildlife Service as part of the Hanford Reach National Monument. Historically, Savage Island has supported small farms and settlements ranging from prior to the Manhattan Project buyout of the lands in 1943; The Wanapum tribe were known to inhabit this particular region. The wildlife of the island include mule deer, coyote, burrowing owl, and western diamondback rattlesnake; the island is primarily arid shrub steppe, with some wetland habitat by the shore of the river.

See also
Locke Island

References

External links
 

Landforms of Franklin County, Washington
Islands of the Columbia River in Washington (state)
Uninhabited islands of Washington (state)